This is a timeline of influenza, briefly describing major events such as outbreaks, epidemics, pandemics, discoveries and developments of vaccines. In addition to specific year/period-related events, there is the seasonal flu that kills between 250,000 and 500,000 people every year and has claimed between 340 million and 1 billion human lives throughout history.

Overview

Full timeline: Hippocrates – 2017 

Influenza has been studied by countless physicians, epidemiologists, and medical historians. Chroniclers distinguished its outbreaks from other diseases by the rapid, indiscriminate way it struck down entire populations. Flu has been called various names including tac, coqueluche, the new disease, grippe, castrone, influenza, and commonly just catarrh by many chroniclers and physicians throughout the ages.

See also
 Influenza
 Timeline of global health

References

influenza
influenza